The 1993–94 Bulgarian Cup was the 54th season of the Bulgarian Cup. Levski Sofia won the competition, beating Pirin Blagoevgrad 1–0 in the final at the Vasil Levski National Stadium in Sofia.

First round

|-
!colspan=3 style="background-color:#D0F0C0;" |24 November 1993

|}

Second round

|-
!colspan=5 style="background-color:#D0F0C0;" |1 / 8 December 1993

|}

Quarter-finals

|-
!colspan=5 style="background-color:#D0F0C0;" |11 / 15 December 1993

|}

Semi-finals

|-
!colspan=5 style="background-color:#D0F0C0;" |3 / 23 March 1994

|-
!colspan=5 style="background-color:#D0F0C0;" |3 / 30 March 1994

|}

Final

Details

References

1993-94
1993–94 domestic association football cups
Cup